Diodora elevata is a species of sea snail, a marine gastropod mollusk in the family Fissurellidae, the keyhole limpets and slit limpets.

Description
The size off the shell reaches 18 mm.

Distribution
This marine species occurs off South Africa from Saldanha Bay to North Transkei.

References

External links
 To World Register of Marine Species
 

Fissurellidae
Gastropods described in 1846